Krishna Jwala Devkota is a Nepali journalist, currently editor-in-chief of the daily national newspaper Naya Patrika.

References

Nepalese journalists
Asian newspaper editors
Living people
Year of birth missing (living people)
Khas people